Pancho se žení is a 1946 Czechoslovak film.

Cast 
 Rudolf Hrušínský – Pancho
 Vlasta Matulová – Rosita
 Jindřich Plachta – Francisco Fernando Rodriguez, Rosita's father

References

External links
 

1946 films
1940s Czech-language films
Czechoslovak black-and-white films
Czech romantic comedy films
Czechoslovak romantic comedy films
1946 romantic comedy films
1940s Czech films
Czech parody films